Rennie Smith (14 April 1888 – 25 May 1962) was a Labour Party politician in the United Kingdom who served as a Member of Parliament (MP) from 1924 to 1931.

At the 1924 general election he was elected as MP for Penistone in Yorkshire, defeating the sitting Liberal MP William Pringle, against whom Smith had stood unsuccessfully in 1923.

Smith held the seat in 1929, but was defeated at the 1931 general election as Labour's vote collapsed following the party's split over Prime Minister Ramsay MacDonald's formation of a National Government. He did not stand for parliament again.

Sources

External links
 

1888 births
1962 deaths
Labour Party (UK) MPs for English constituencies
UK MPs 1924–1929
UK MPs 1929–1931
Politics of Penistone